Nessia burtonii, commonly known as Burton's nessia, Gray's snake skink, or the three-toed snakeskink, is a species of skink, a lizard in the family Scincidae. The species is endemic to the island of Sri Lanka.

Etymology
The specific name, burtonii, is in honor of British army surgeon Edward Burton (1790–1867).

Habitat and geographic range
N. burtonii occurs in the wet zone of Sri Lanka. It is sub-fossorial and occurs under leaf litter, boulders, and decaying logs in a variety of habitats: forests, plantations, and home gardens.

Description
N. burtoni has 24–26 scale rows at midbody. The body is slender and of equal girth from head to tail. The snout is acute. Each limb has three tiny clawed toes, hence one of the common names. The dorsum is brown or light reddish brown, each scale with a darker edge. The venter is creamy or may be gray.

Ecology and diet
When exposed, it immediately wriggles into loose soil or under rubble. When caught, it regurgitates its food, presumably as a predator-deflection response. It forages at night on insects and possibly earthworms.

Reproduction
N. burtoni is oviparous. Two eggs are laid in loose soil..

References

Further reading
Boulenger GA (1887). Catalogue of the Lizards in the British Museum (Natural History). Second Edition. Volume III. ... Scincidæ ... London: Trustees of the British Museum (Natural History). (Taylor and Francis, printers). xii + 575 pp. + Plates I-XL. (Acontias burtonii, p. 425).
Boulenger GA (1890). The Fauna of British India, Including Ceylon and Burma. Reptilia and Batrachia. London: Secretary of State for India in Council. (Taylor and Francis, printers). xviii + 541 pp. (Acontias burtonii, p. 227).
Gray JE (1839). "Catalogue of the Slender-tongued Saurians, with Descriptions of many new Genera and Species". Annals and Magazine of Natural History [First Series] 2: 331–337. ("Nessia Burtonii [sic]", new species, p. 336).
Gray JE (1845). Catalogue of the Lizards in the Collection of the British Museum. London: Trustees of the British Museum. (Edward Newman, printer). xxviii + 289 pp. ("Nessia Burtoni [sic]", p. 126).
Günther ACLG (1864). The Reptiles of British India. London: The Ray Society. (Taylor and Francis, printers). xxvii + 452 pp. + Plates I–XXVI. (Nessia burtonii, p. 97).
Smith MA (1935). The Fauna of British India, Including Ceylon and Burma. Reptilia and Amphibia. Vol. II.—Sauria. London: Secretary of State for India in Council. (Taylor and Francis, printers). xiii + 440 pp. + Plate I + 2 maps. ("Nessia burtoni [sic]", pp. 357–358).

External links
Photos of Burton's snake skink

Nessia
Reptiles of Sri Lanka
Endemic fauna of Sri Lanka
Reptiles described in 1839
Taxa named by John Edward Gray